Stewart Dean Talbot (born 14 June 1973) is an English former footballer who played as a midfielder. He made over 300 appearances in the Football League in an eleven years professional career.

Starting his career with non-league Moor Green, he was signed by Port Vale in 1994. After six years at Vale Park he moved on to Rotherham United, where he spent four years. He played over 100 league games for each club. He then played over fifty games for Brentford before leaving the English Football League in 2005 to join Boston United. He spent four years at Boston before finishing his career at Kidsgrove Athletic.

Career

Port Vale
Talbot played for non-league Moor Green, also having a brief time with Doncaster Rovers. He entered the English Football League with Port Vale of the First Division in August 1994. At the age of 21, he entered professional football at a late stage and was one of numerous players who owed their careers to John Rudge. His debut came on 29 April 1995, in a 1–1 draw with Charlton Athletic at The Valley. He played in the 1996 Anglo-Italian Cup Final, as Vale lost 5–2 to Genoa. By 1996–97 the club had reached its peak, before a slow but steady decline. The club finished eighth in the second tier, Talbot played in 34 of these games, including two Potteries derby clashes. He was in even greater demand the next season, making 45 appearances, justifying his reputation as a hard working player. He also racked up thirteen yellow cards and six goals.

In 1998–99 he played 35 games, though didn't find the scoresheet. He was at the club for the dismissal of "Rudgie" – the end of an era. Talbot still found himself in the first team with new man Brian Horton though, the club barely surviving relegation. On 27 April, in a 2–1 defeat by Watford at Vale Park, he was stretchered with a broken leg off after 33 minutes, following a challenge by Paul Robinson. The injury resulted in ten months out of action, needing a breakthrough motion fixation treatment to speed up the recovery process. It took ten months for him to regain match fitness. Four years later he successfully sued Robinson and Watford F.C., settling out of court for "a substantial six-figure sum". The team fell well short in 1999–2000 however, going down in 23rd place. Talbot made it onto the pitch just six times following recovery from his injury, Vale salvaging just one point of a possible eighteen. His association with the Burslem club was over, after six seasons at Vale Park he moved on to Second Division new boys Rotherham United in July 2000.

Rotherham United
United won their second successive promotion in 2000–01, again finishing runners-up. Talbot played 43 games of the campaign, picking up seven yellow cards as well as straight red along the way. Talbot was no stranger to the First Division of course, though the "Millers" were. After another 40+ games season for Talbot, United finished above relegated Crewe Alexandra thanks to their superior goal difference and despite a 2–0 defeat at Gresty Road in late April. After a couple of runs in the 2002 half of the season, broken up by a persistent knee injury, Ronnie Moore dropped Talbot. In February he joined Shrewsbury Town of the Third Division on a one-month loan, playing seven games. On his return to Millmoor he was expected to re-join the "Shrews" in their battle to avoid the Conference National, but instead he found himself back in first team contention with Rotherham, playing five games before the end of the season. In 2003–04 he made 28 appearances, in which he was booked seven times and sent off once, including a run of four yellow cards in four games. By January time he was dropped yet again, in February he dropped down a division, joining Brentford on a -year contract on a free transfer.

Later career
Talbot's 37 League One appearances helped his new club to the play-off places in 2004–05, though they were bettered by Sheffield Wednesday in the semi-finals. Talbot told manager Martin Allen that he wanted to return to the North, he joined League Two Boston United on a free transfer in June 2005. By now a veteran, he played 36 games in 2005–06.

In 2006–07 Boston lost their Football League status, Talbot making twenty appearances in his final season in the Football League. Only Talbot and Paul Ellender stayed beyond the summer. In 2007–08, the club were playing in the Conference North because of their financial difficulties. They were promptly kicked out of that division at the end of the season, leaving them with an intolerable fall from grace – effectively three relegations in just two seasons. So they started the 2008–09 season in the Northern Premier League. Talbot briefly managed United for one game against Nantwich Town on 5 January after manager Steve Welsh became ill. The team capitulated 5–0, spelling doom for Talbot. Welsh released Talbot soon after, and the player signed for Kidsgrove Athletic (one level below in the Division One South). He left Kidsgrove in the summer of 2009.

Style of play
The Rotherham United website states that Talbot was a "midfield dynamo" with "powerful tackling".

Post-retirement
Since leaving the professional game, Talbot took up a position in child care in North Staffordshire. By 2015 he quit child care to become an overhead linesman with Network Rail in Crewe.

Career statistics
Source:

Honours
Port Vale
Anglo-Italian Cup runner-up: 1996

Rotherham United
Football League Second Division second-place promotion: 2000–01

References

1973 births
Living people
Footballers from Birmingham, West Midlands
Association football midfielders
English footballers
Moor Green F.C. players
Port Vale F.C. players
Rotherham United F.C. players
Shrewsbury Town F.C. players
Brentford F.C. players
Boston United F.C. players
Kidsgrove Athletic F.C. players
English Football League players
National League (English football) players
Northern Premier League players
English football managers
Boston United F.C. managers
Northern Premier League managers